Robert Oepkes Guerain (born 17 January 1992) is a Dutch former footballer who played as a left-back. He has gained five caps for the Netherlands U15 team.

Football career
Guerain played in the PSV youth academy for five years. In 2012, he moved to Almere City. In January 2014, he left Almere due to a lack of future prospects. After a trial in Romania with Ceahlăul Piatra Neamț did not pan out, he practiced with SV Huizen in mid-2014. In the summer of 2014, Guerain found a new professional club in Italian club Triestina. After six months, he returned to the Netherlands to play in the Saturday Hoofdklasse A for SV Huizen.

Guerain since played for several lower tier clubs in the Netherlands, including Nieuw Utrecht, USV Hercules, ZSGOWMS, and FC Almere. In October 2020, he signed with DHSC in the Hoofdklasse, a club which Wesley Sneijder was involved with, before retiring at the end of the season.

Outside football
Guerain founded Certo in 2019, a sales recruitment agency. He formerly worked with software sales.

References

External links
 Robert Guerain at Voetbal International

1992 births
Living people
Dutch footballers
Footballers from Almere
Dutch expatriate footballers
Netherlands youth international footballers
Association football fullbacks
Almere City FC players
FC Utrecht players
PSV Eindhoven players
U.S. Triestina Calcio 1918 players
SV Huizen players
USV Hercules players
DHSC players
Eerste Divisie players
Serie D players
Vierde Divisie players
Derde Divisie players
Eerste Klasse players
Expatriate footballers in Italy
Dutch expatriate sportspeople in Italy